Mavoko Constituency is a constituency in Kenya. It is one of eight constituencies in Machakos County.

References 

Constituencies in Machakos County